The meridian 20° west of Greenwich is a line of longitude that extends from the North Pole across the Arctic Ocean, Greenland, Iceland, the Atlantic Ocean, the Southern Ocean, and Antarctica to the South Pole.  
The 20th meridian west forms a great circle with the 160th meridian east.

In Antarctica, the meridian defines the border between the British Antarctic Territory and Queen Maud Land. Between the 5th parallel north and the 60th parallel south it forms the eastern boundary of the Latin American Nuclear-Weapon-Free Zone.

From Pole to Pole
Starting at the North Pole and heading south to the South Pole, the 20th meridian west passes through:

{| class="wikitable plainrowheaders"
! scope="col" width="125" | Co-ordinates
! scope="col" | Country, territory or sea
! scope="col" | Notes
|-
| style="background:#b0e0e6;" | 
! scope="row" style="background:#b0e0e6;" | Arctic Ocean
| style="background:#b0e0e6;" |
|-
| 
! scope="row" | 
|
|-
| style="background:#b0e0e6;" | 
! scope="row" style="background:#b0e0e6;" | Jokel Bay
| style="background:#b0e0e6;" |
|-
| 
! scope="row" | 
| Gamma Island and Germania Land
|-
| style="background:#b0e0e6;" | 
! scope="row" style="background:#b0e0e6;" | Dove Bay
| style="background:#b0e0e6;" |
|-
| 
! scope="row" | 
| Mainland, Kuhn Island, and the mainland again
|-
| style="background:#b0e0e6;" | 
! scope="row" style="background:#b0e0e6;" | Atlantic Ocean
| style="background:#b0e0e6;" | Greenland Sea
|-valign="top"
| 
! scope="row" | 
| Northwestern RegionWestern RegionSouthern Region
|-
| style="background:#b0e0e6;" | 
! scope="row" style="background:#b0e0e6;" | Atlantic Ocean
| style="background:#b0e0e6;" |
|-
| style="background:#b0e0e6;" | 
! scope="row" style="background:#b0e0e6;" | Southern Ocean
| style="background:#b0e0e6;" |
|-valign="top"
| 
! scope="row" | Antarctica
|-
|}

See also
19th meridian west
21st meridian west

w020 meridian west
Borders of Norway
Borders of the United Kingdom